Edward Mulhern (28 January 1863 – 12 August 1943) was the Roman Catholic Bishop of the Diocese of Dromore, Northern Ireland.

He was a native of Ederney in Co. Fermanagh and after a local education was ordained priest in Maynooth College 16 September 1889 for service in the Diocese of Clogher.

He spent many years as a teacher in, and was eventually President of, St Macartan's College in Monaghan. In 1903 he moved to parish ministry and was Parish Priest of Bundoran at the time of his elevation.

His appointment to Dromore was announced on 31 Jan 1916 and he received episcopal consecration in Newry on 30 April 1916. 

Among his principal works as Bishop was wiping out the debt on and thus formally consecrating the cathedral of Saints Patrick and Colman in Newry and the restoration of the Cathedral Chapter.

He died in office in August 1943.

References

External links
 

1863 births
1943 deaths
People from County Fermanagh
19th-century Roman Catholic bishops in Ireland
People educated at St Macartan's College, Monaghan
Alumni of St Patrick's College, Maynooth
Roman Catholic bishops of Dromore